Michael Garteig (born November 5, 1991) is a Canadian professional ice hockey goaltender who is currently playing for ERC Ingolstadt in the Deutsche Eishockey Liga (DEL). Garteig has previously played for Utica Comets and Toronto Marlies of the American Hockey League (AHL).

Playing career
Garteig played for the Powell River Kings and the Penticton Vees in the British Columbia Hockey League for four seasons. He won the BCHL Top Goaltender Awards in 2011 and 2012, and was a member of the 2012 Royal Bank Cup-winning Penticton Vees team.

Garteig then played collegiate hockey for the Quinnipiac Bobcats. He burst onto the scene after his freshman year. It culminated in leading the Bobcats to the ECAC championship and the NCAA finals during his fourth season, in which Quinnipiac was defeated by the University of North Dakota. He turned in his finest collegiate season that year, posting a 32–4–7 record, .924 save percentage and 1.91 goals against average. During his four seasons with Quinnipiac, he amassed a record of 78–25–16 with a 1.98 goals against average and a .917 save percentage.

After his fourth year at Quinnipiac University, Garteig signed a one-year entry level contract with the Vancouver Canucks, and was earmarked for the Canucks' American Hockey League affiliate, the Utica Comets, for the 2016–17 season. 
After participating as a prospect at the Vancouver Canucks' 2016 Development camp, Garteig joined Utica on September 29, 2016. but was reassigned to the Alaska Aces of the ECHL. On November 17, 2016, he was called up by the Canucks from the Aces, but on November 19, 2016, Canucks Media announced that he would return to the Aces.

As a free agent from the Canucks, Garteig opted to remain within the organization by signing a one-year AHL contract to continue with the Utica Comets on August 24, 2017.

Following his third North American professional season, primarily playing in the ECHL and claiming the Kelly Cup with the Newfoundland Growlers, Garteig embarked on a European career by signing with top flight Finnish club, Tappara of the Liiga on June 19, 2019. In the following 2019–20 season, as Tappara's starting goaltender, Garteig collected 15 wins through 39 regular season games. Helping the club finish the regular season in third place in the standings the playoffs were then cancelled due to the COVID-19 pandemic.

Leaving Tappara at the conclusion of his contract, Garteig remained in Europe to sign a one-year contract for the 2020–21 season with German club, ERC Ingolstadt of the DEL, on September 8, 2020.

Career statistics

Awards and honours

References

External links

1991 births
Living people
Alaska Aces (ECHL) players
Canadian ice hockey goaltenders
ERC Ingolstadt players
HIFK (ice hockey) players
Kalamazoo Wings (ECHL) players
Newfoundland Growlers players
Penticton Vees players
Powell River Kings players
Quesnel Millionaires players
Quinnipiac Bobcats men's ice hockey players
Tappara players
Toronto Marlies players
Utica Comets players